Dhoke Khabba (literal meaning "The Town on the Left") is a neighbourhood and a Union Council of Rawalpindi City located in the heart of Rawalpindi City, in close proximity to Murree Road and next to Pakistan Air Force (PAF) Noor Khan Base. It has many old homes of pre-partition era of the Indian subcontinent. Nearby main bus stop is Committee Chowk. Noorani and Chup Shah are famous mosques.

Although many college level educational institutes are present in close proximity of this area, literacy rate here remains quiet low. Most of the people here manage their own small businesses and some of them are living abroad i.e. in Australia, UK, Sweden, Germany, Dubai, and Saudi Arabia.

Dhoke Khabba has a famous Sunday market (Itwar Bazaar) near the old Kahakshan cinema. Famous adjacent areas are Dhoke Farman Ali, Dhoke Elahi Baksh, Arya Mohallah.

Dhoke Khabba is connected via Rawal Road and Murree Road. It consists of several streets. It is also known for its graveyard. It also adjoins Mukha Singh-a sub constituent of Dhoke Khabba- which includes a park. 

Near Dhoke khabba is Rawalpindi Institute of Cardiology inaugurated by Mian Muhammad Shahbaz Sharif in 2010. 

Populated places in Rawalpindi City
Union Councils of Rawalpindi City
Rawalpindi City